English Phonetics and Phonology may refer to:
English phonology
English Phonetics and Phonology: An Introduction, book by Philip Carr
English Phonetics and Phonology: A Practical Course, book by Peter Roach